"A Mathematical Theory of Communication" is an article by mathematician Claude E. Shannon published in Bell System Technical Journal in 1948. It was renamed The Mathematical Theory of Communication in the 1949 book of the same name, a small but significant title change after realizing the generality of this work. It became one of the most cited scientific articles and gave rise to the field of information theory.

Publication
The article was the founding work of the field of information theory. It was later published in 1949 as a book titled The Mathematical Theory of Communication, which was published as a paperback in 1963. The book contains an additional article by Warren Weaver, providing an overview of the theory for a more general audience.

Contents

Shannon's article laid out the basic elements of communication:
An information source that produces a message
A transmitter that operates on the message to create a signal which can be sent through a channel
A channel, which is the medium over which the signal, carrying the information that composes the message, is sent
A receiver, which transforms the signal back into the message intended for delivery
A destination, which can be a person or a machine, for whom or which the message is intended

It also developed the concepts of information entropy and redundancy, and introduced the term bit (which Shannon credited to John Tukey) as a unit of information. It was also in this paper that the Shannon–Fano coding technique was proposed – a technique developed in conjunction with Robert Fano.

References

External links 
 (PDF) "A Mathematical Theory of Communication" by C. E. Shannon hosted by the Harvard Mathematics Department, at Harvard University
 Khan Academy video about "A Mathematical Theory of Communication"

1963 non-fiction books
Information theory
Computer science books
Mathematics books
Mathematics papers
Works originally published in American magazines
1948 documents
Works originally published in science and technology magazines
Texts related to the history of the Internet
Claude Shannon